ASKO Kara is a Togolese football club based in Kara. They play in the top division in Togolese football.

History
The manager Améleté Abalo was shot dead on 8 January 2010 in a terrorist attack against the Togo national football team.

Achievements
Togolese Championnat National: 7
1988, 1989, 1996, 2007, 2019–20, 2021, 2021–22

Coupe du Togo: 4
1975, 1976, 1987, 1995

Performance in CAF competitions
 CAF Champions League: 1 appearance
2008 – First Round
2020/21 - First Round 
2021/22 - First Round 
2022/23 - In Progress
 African Cup of Champions Clubs: 1 appearance
1990: First Round

CAF Cup: 1 appearance
1997 – First Round

CAF Cup Winners' Cup: 4 appearances
1976 – First Round
1977 – First Round
1988 – First Round
1996 – First Round

Current squad

References

Football clubs in Togo
1974 establishments in Togo